Cyprus Turkish Airlines Limited was a Turkish Cypriot airline that served as the flag carrier for Northern Cyprus. Until its collapse in June 2010, Cyprus Turkish Airlines was the primary airline flying passengers to Northern Cyprus.

KTHY operated scheduled flights from Ercan, Northern Cyprus, to several cities in Turkey, the United Kingdom, and Western and Northern Europe. Its main base was Ercan Airport, in the Turkish sector of Nicosia.

The airline was de jure registered as a Turkish company in Istanbul. Day-to-day operations were run from Ercan. All flights to Europe were required to make a stop at an airport in mainland Turkey.

History
Cyprus Turkish Airlines was established on 4 December 1974 in Nicosia, with shares equally divided between Turkish Airlines and the Cash Development of the Consolidated Fund of the Assembly of the Turkish Cypriot Community (Konsolide Fonu Inkisaf Sandigi). The first scheduled flight took place on 3 February 1975.

In 2005, the Turkish government sold its shares to Ada Havayollari.

By June 2010, KTHY had incurred a $100 million debt, and its management decided to sell the company to avoid bankruptcy. The Turkish carrier Atlasjet was the only bidder.

On 21 June 2010, the airline announced via its website that it had ceased all operations until further notice. On 29 June 2010, it was announced that the airline had gone out of business.

Timeline

 1975—First scheduled flight takes place on 3 February
 1976—Airline begins leasing aircraft including DC-9s, Boeing 727-200s, and Boeing 720s
 Sales office opens in Kyrenia
 1977—Company registered in Istanbul, Turkey
 1981—Scheduled flights to London begin
 1990—Two 727-200s purchased
 1991—Ground operations staff and cockpit / cabin crew employed
 2000—Airline begins leasing two Boeing 737-800s long-term
 2002—Upon completion of technical flight hours, all four 727-200s are grounded and sold
 2004—Airline begins leasing three Airbus A321-200s long-term
 In-flight magazine Caretta re-introduced
 2006—ISO 9001-2000 Quality Control System certificate obtained in April
 Departure Control System begins operating at Ercan International Airport
 Ground services in Turkish airports contracted to HAVAŞ in December
 2007—Cyprus Airport Services formed, following on from KTHY's partnership with HAVAŞ
 2008—Male cabin staff added
 Protocol for flights to Sweden, Norway, and Finland signed with DETUR
 2009—First scheduled flight to Scandinavia on 7 February, to Helsinki
 Charter flights to Italy, Romania, Slovenia, and Hungary planned
 Airline receives delivery of one Airbus A320-200
 Planned expansion of fleet to 12 aircraft by 2012 announced 
 2010—Operations cease on 21 June
 Bankruptcy declared on 19 September
 2014—Re-launch as Karpas Airlines planned for April

Destinations

Fleet

As of 13 March 2010, the Cyprus Turkish Airlines fleet consisted of the following aircraft:

As of 14 March 2010, the average age of the fleet was 6.5 years. According to the Cyprus Observer, KTHY had planned to extend its fleet to 12 aircraft, to be in service by 2012 with the airline's updated livery.

Most of the fleet parked at Ercan overnight, but some aircraft overnighted at Turkish airports.

Former fleet
4 Boeing 727-200s
1 Boeing 737-200
1 Airbus A300B4 (leased from August to September 1996 from Holiday Air)
1 Airbus A310-200
1 Airbus A310-300
1 Airbus A320-231
2 Airbus A321-211s
1 McDonnell Douglas MD-81
1 McDonnell Douglas MD-82
2 McDonnell Douglas MD-90-30s

Services

Travel classes
Cyprus Turkish Airlines offered only two classes: 
 Economy: This class was offered on all of the new aircraft. Full meal or snack service was provided free of charge. In-flight entertainment was not offered.
 Economy Plus: This class was introduced after KTHY's elimination of Business and First Class services years earlier, due to the grounding of its Airbus A310s and Boeing 727s.

Express check-in
In early 2008, the airline introduced an express check-in service at Ercan for passengers who were not checking any bags. There were separate express check-in counters for passengers with only carry-on luggage and for those without any luggage at all.

Frequent flyer programme
The airline had a "Special Passenger Programme for Frequent Flyers". Participants had priority for seat reservations and an extra baggage allowance, avoided waiting at check-in, and earned points redeemable for travel.

Personnel
All Cyprus Turkish Airlines flight attendants were women until the start of the 2008 summer schedule in July, when the airline began using male flight attendants as well.

Strike action
On 7 April 2010, starting at 6 a.m., Cyprus Turkish Airlines staff staged a six-hour wildcat strike that grounded all planes. Travellers to and from Northern Cyprus were distressed and severely inconvenienced. Communication from the airline to travelers about the delays was poor.

In-flight magazine
A monthly, in-flight magazine was produced for KTHY, titled Caretta. It generally contained information about Northern Cyprus such as cultural background, tourist destinations, and upcoming events. The magazine was also available on the airline's website.

Hijacking
On 30 March 1998, Mehmet Ertürk hijacked a KTHY flight from Ercan to Ankara, using a lighter designed to resemble a hand grenade. The plane landed safely in Ankara, and Ertürk was arrested.

See also 
 List of airlines of Northern Cyprus

References

External links

 

Defunct airlines of Turkey
Airlines established in 1974
Airlines disestablished in 2010
Organisations based in Northern Cyprus
Former Star Alliance affiliate members